Queen of the Scala (Italian: Regina della Scala) is a 1937 Italian drama film directed by Camillo Mastrocinque and Guido Salvini and starring Margherita Carosio, Nives Poli and Giuseppe Addobbati.

The film's sets were designed by the art directors Virgilio Marchi. It was shot at the Tirrenia Studios and on location in Lombardy.

Partial cast
 Margherita Carosio as Marta Bianchi 
 Nives Poli as La ballerina Luzia 
 Giuseppe Addobbati as Guido Vernieri 
 Mario Ferrari as Candido Ponti 
 Olivia Fried as Olivia Ferry 
 Bianca Stagno Bellincioni as Madame Chautemps 
 Guido Papalini as Un giornalista
 Laura Solari
 Osvaldo Valenti 
 Rubi Dalma

References

Bibliography
 Enrico Lancia & Roberto Poppi. Le attrici: dal 1930 ai giorni nostri. Gremese Editore, 2003.

External links 

1937 films
Italian drama films
1937 drama films
1930s Italian-language films
Films directed by Camillo Mastrocinque
Films directed by Guido Salvini
Films shot at Tirrenia Studios
Italian black-and-white films
1930s Italian films